Charleston is a town in Montgomery County, New York, United States.  The population was 1,373 at the 2010 census. The town was named for Charles Van Epps, an early settler.

The Town of Charleston is on the southern border of the county and is southwest of the City of Amsterdam.

Charleston is the only town in the county not bordering the Mohawk River.

History 
Parts of Charleston were in Corry's Patent (1737), Stone Heap Patent (1770), and Thomas Machin's Patent (1787).  Settlers began arriving before the American Revolution.

The Town of Charleston was formed by a division of the original "Town of Mohawk" in 1793.  This division, which also created the Town of Florida, terminated Mohawk as a town until another town with that name (Mohawk) was created in 1837.  Charleston was reduced in size in 1823, when the Towns of Glen and Root (in part) were established.

The First Baptist Church was listed on the National Register of Historic Places in 1994.

Geography

The southern town line is the border of Schoharie County, and the eastern town boundary  is defined by the Schoharie Creek.

New York State Route 30A is a north-south highway.  New York State Route 162 cuts across the southwestern corner of the town.

Demographics

As of the census of 2000, there were 1,292 people, 472 households, and 343 families residing in the town.  The population density was 30.3 people per square mile (11.7/km2).  There were 564 housing units at an average density of 13.2 per square mile (5.1/km2).  The racial makeup of the town was 97.68% White, 0.85% African American, 0.08% Native American, 0.23% Asian, 0.08% from other races, and 1.08% from two or more races. Hispanic or Latino of any race were 1.16% of the population.

There were 472 households, out of which 34.7% had children under the age of 18 living with them, 60.8% were married couples living together, 6.8% had a female householder with no husband present, and 27.3% were non-families. 18.6% of all households were made up of individuals, and 7.0% had someone living alone who was 65 years of age or older.  The average household size was 2.74 and the average family size was 3.15.

In the town, the population was spread out, with 26.2% under the age of 18, 7.6% from 18 to 24, 31.3% from 25 to 44, 24.3% from 45 to 64, and 10.6% who were 65 years of age or older.  The median age was 37 years. For every 100 females, there were 102.2 males.  For every 100 females age 18 and over, there were 102.8 males.

The median income for a household in the town was $38,125, and the median income for a family was $45,221. Males had a median income of $35,300 versus $21,184 for females. The per capita income for the town was $16,818.  About 6.6% of families and 10.1% of the population were below the poverty line, including 12.6% of those under age 18 and 4.4% of those age 65 or over.

Communities and locations in Charleston 
Burtonville – A hamlet at the eastern town line by the Schoharie Creek.
Charleston (also called "Riders Corners") – The hamlet of Charleston is located on NY-30A.
Charleston Four Corners – A hamlet southwest of Charleston village, located on NY-162.
Davis Corners – A location southwest of Charleston village on NY-30A.
Fox Corners – A location southwest of Charleston village.
Lib Corners – A location northeast of Oak Ridge.
Lost Valley – A location at the eastern town line and Schoharie River, north of Burtonville.
Market Corners – A location between Charleston village and Oak Ridge on NY-30A.
Oak Ridge – A hamlet south of Charleston village on NY-30A and near the southern town line.
Rockwell Corners – A location by the southern town boundary.

References

External links
  Early Charleston history

Towns in Montgomery County, New York